Khalif Wyatt (born June 10, 1991) is an American professional basketball player who last played for SCM U Craiova in the Liga Națională. He was the Atlantic 10 Conference Player of the Year as a college basketball senior in the 2012–13 season, after leading the Owls to the Round of 32 in the 2013 NCAA tournament. Wyatt led Temple in scoring in his final college season, with a 20.5 points per game average.

High school
Wyatt attended Norristown Area High School in Norristown, Pennsylvania from 2005–06 to 2008–09. In his junior season he averaged 18.0 points while guiding them to a 33–2 record. Norristown lost the state championship game to powerhouse Chester High School, which also featured future Temple teammate Rahlir Jefferson. The next year, Wyatt's senior season, he averaged 20 points, four rebounds and four assists while leading Norristown to the PIAA Class AAAA District championship. He earned Second Team All-State accolades for the second year in a row as well.

College career
Wyatt played in 10 games during his freshman campaign in 2009–10 in which Temple won both the Atlantic 10 Conference (A-10) regular season and conference tournament titles. In Wyatt's sophomore season, he averaged 10.1 points and 1.3 steals per game and was named the A-10's Sixth Man of the Year. In 2011–12, his junior season, the Temple Owls won the A-10 regular season title for the second time in three years. Wyatt was second on the team in scoring with a 17.1 points per game average that also ranked fourth in the conference. Despite the success, the Owls entered the 2012 NCAA tournament as a 5-seed but were upset in the Round of 64 by 12-seed South Florida. Wyatt earned Second Team All-Conference honors, however.

In his final season, Temple finished in a three-way tie for third place in the A-10. Wyatt led the team in scoring with 20.5 points per game; he also averaged 2.9 rebounds, 4.0 assists and 1.7 steals. Despite losing in the first round of the A-10 tournament, the Owls had finished the regular season with a 23–8 overall record and were invited to participate in the 2013 NCAA tournament via an at-large bid. The 9th-seeded Owls then defeated 8th-seeded NC State behind Wyatt's 31 points to advance to the Round of 32. In their next match-up, they took on #1-seed Indiana who had national player of the year candidate Cody Zeller in their line-up. Temple battled them toe-to-toe, and Wyatt was so effective against them that Indiana coach Tom Crean employed a special defensive tactic, called a full-court face-guard, against him (whereby an opposing player's primary responsibility for that game is to follow that player around all over the court to prevent him from even catching the ball). The Owls were just several possessions away including one big-time three-point shot by Victor Oladipo away from upsetting one of the best teams in the country. Wyatt still managed to score 31 points in the loss. Tom Crean said in his post-game conference that Wyatt was the best player that Indiana had played all season and that Temple was the toughest team they had also faced. Khalif Wyatt was named an A-10 First Team All-Conference selection as well as the A-10 Player of the Year, becoming Temple's 10th overall recipient of that award. On April 15, 2013, Wyatt was named the Philadelphia Big 5 Player of the Year, awarded annually to the player who performs the best throughout Philadelphia "Big 5" inner-city games among the five member schools that season.

Relationship with Fran Dunphy
He and head coach Fran Dunphy did not see eye-to-eye and frequently got into arguments early throughout Wyatt's career. Dunphy said that Wyatt "was killing [him] with high maintenance" and how "In the beginning, he had his way of doing things and I had mine." Wyatt would be late to meetings, doctors' appointments and practices, his defense was considered at times lazy and undisciplined, and he would make "head-scratching" plays more frequently than a coach would like. As Wyatt's tenure with Temple lengthened, he and Dunphy's relationship grew, and by the time he was a senior in 2012–13 there was great mutual respect for one another. In March 2013, after Wyatt's career had concluded, he said, "Coming in here as a 17-year-old, you think you know everything. You think you have the answers to everything. Coach Dunphy helped me grow up a lot. He really was like a father to me for four years. He pretty much raised me from 17 to 22. I'm happy I had him in my life. Through everything, he's stuck with me. He had my best interests at heart."

Professional career

Guangdong Southern Tigers (2013–2014) 
After going undrafted in the 2013 NBA draft, Wyatt was chosen to participate for his hometown Philadelphia 76ers in the 2013 NBA Summer League. On September 27, 2013, Wyatt signed with the Philadelphia 76ers. He was later waived by the 76ers on October 25.

On October 28, 2013, Wyatt signed with the Chinese team Guangdong Southern Tigers. In January 2014, he left China.

Springfield Armor (2014)
On February 13, 2014, he was acquired by the Reno Bighorns of the NBA Development League. Four days later, he was traded to the Springfield Armor. In Wyatt's debut with the Armor, he scored 19 points in a 108–117 loss to the Fort Wayne Mad Ants.

Hapoel Eilat (2014–2016)

On July 17, 2014, Wyatt signed a two-year deal with the Israeli team Hapoel Eilat. In his first season with Eilat, he averaged 14.2 points, 3.8 assists and 2.2 rebounds per game. Wyatt led Eilat to the 2015 Israeli League Finals, where they eventually lost to Hapoel Jerusalem. On June 19, 2015, Wyatt earned a spot in the All-Israeli League First Team.

On March 7, 2016, Wyatt recorded a then career-high 33 points, shooting 9-of-12 from 3-point range in an 85–76 win over Ironi Nes Ziona. Wyatt led Eilat to the 2016 Israeli League Final Four, where they lost to Hapoel Jerusalem. On June 3, 2016, Wyatt earned a spot in the All-Israeli League First Team for two years in a row.

Hapoel Holon (2016–2017)
On August 2, 2016, Wyatt signed with Hapoel Holon for the 2016–17 season, joining his former head coach Dan Shamir. On January 1, 2017, Wyatt was named Israeli League Player of the Month for games played in December. On February 4, 2017, Wyatt suffered a knee injury in a match against Maccabi Rishon LeZion and later was ruled out for the rest of the season.

Ironi Nes Ziona (2018)
On January 9, 2018, Wyatt signed with Ironi Nes Ziona for a one-month temporary contract with an option to extend it for the rest of the season. On February 5, 2018, his second game with Nes Ziona, Wyatt recorded a season-high 25 points, along with 4 assists in an 81–84 loss to Maccabi Ashdod. On March 4, 2018, Wyatt recorded 23 points, shooting 6-for-7 from three-point range, along with 4 assists and led Nes Ziona to an 85–76 win over Maccabi Tel Aviv. He was subsequently named Israeli League Round 18 MVP. Wyatt led Nes Ziona to the 2018 Israeli League Playoffs, where they eventually lost to Maccabi Tel Aviv.

Return to Holon (2018)
On July 7, 2018, Wyatt returned to Hapoel Holon for a second stint, signing a one-year deal. On October 17, 2018, Wyatt recorded a career-high 35 points, shooting 8-of-16 from 3-point range, along with five rebounds and five assists in a 104–111 overtime loss to Reyer Venezia. In December 2018, his knee problems ruled him out again, until the end of the season.

San Miguel Alab Pilipinas (2019–2020)
On October 23, 2019, Wyatt signed a three-month contract with Philippines-based San Miguel Alab Pilipinas of the pan-ASEAN Basketball League (ABL) as one of its three import players. He appeared in eight games for the Alab Pilipinas, averaging 16.3 points, 3.8 rebounds and 4.7 assists per game. On January 16, 2020, Wyatt parted ways with the team.

Châlons-Reims (2020)
On January 30, 2020, Wyatt signed with Champagne Châlons-Reims of the French LNB Pro A.

The Basketball Tournament
Khalif Wyatt played for Team Sons of Westwood in the 2018 edition of The Basketball Tournament. In three games, he averaged 7.0 points per game and 2.0 assists per game. Team Sons of Westwood ALS made it to the Super 16 before falling to Team Challenge ALS.

Career statistics

Domestic Leagues

|-
| style="text-align:center;" | 2013–14
| style="text-align:left;" rowspan=1| Guangdong
| style="text-align:center;" rowspan=1| CBA
| 28 || 26.3 || .450 || .358 || .763 || 2.3 || 4.9 || 1.3 || .1 || 14.6
|-
| style="text-align:center;" | 2014
| style="text-align:left;" rowspan=1| Springfield Armor
| style="text-align:center;" rowspan=1| NBDL
|| 20 || 28.5 || .447 || .412 || .812 || 2.4 || 3.5 || 1.6 || 0 || 16.2
|-
| style="text-align:center;" | 2014–15
| style="text-align:left;" rowspan=2| Hapoel Eilat
| style="text-align:center;" rowspan=5| IPL
| 44 || 27.3 || .400 || .329 || .826 || 2.2 || 3.8 || 1.0 || .1 || 14.2
|-
| style="text-align:center;" | 2015–16
| 37 || 28.7 || .424 || .342 || .874 || 2.6 || 4.4 || 1.4 || .1 || 15.0
|-
| style="text-align:center;" | 2016–17
| style="text-align:left;" | Hapoel Holon
| 18 ||30.9 || .407 || .300 || .812 || 2.5 || 4.0 || 1.2 || .1 || 18.7
|-
| style="text-align:center;" | 2017–18
| style="text-align:left;" | Ironi Nes Ziona
| 23 || 27.4 || .424 || .426 || .707 || 1.7 || 3.6 || 1.1 || .2 || 14.1
|-
| style="text-align:center;" | 2018–19
| style="text-align:left;" | Hapoel Holon
| 10 || 26.7 || .354 || .333 || .820 || 1.8 || 5.6 || 1.3 || .0 || 12.7
|-
| style="text-align:center;" | 2019–20
| style="text-align:left;" rowspan=1| Alab Pilipinas
| style="text-align:center;" rowspan=1| ABL
| 8 || 29.3 || .460 || .470 || .910 || 3.8 || 4.7 || .7 || .1 || 16.3
|-
|}
Source: RealGM & ASEAN Basketball League

References

External links
RealGM profile
Khalif Wyatt @ sports-reference.com

1991 births
Living people
American expatriate basketball people in China
American expatriate basketball people in Israel
American expatriate basketball people in the Philippines
American men's basketball players
Basketball players from Pennsylvania
Guangdong Southern Tigers players
Hapoel Eilat basketball players
Hapoel Holon players
Ironi Nes Ziona B.C. players
People from Norristown, Pennsylvania
Point guards
San Miguel Alab Pilipinas players
Shooting guards
Sportspeople from Montgomery County, Pennsylvania
Springfield Armor players
Temple Owls men's basketball players